Teladoma murina is a moth in the family Cosmopterigidae. It is found in North America, where it has been recorded from Texas and Arizona.

References

Natural History Museum Lepidoptera generic names catalog

Cosmopteriginae